"Rumor Has It" is a song written by Bruce Burch, Vern Dant and Larry Shell, and recorded by American country music artist Reba McEntire.  It was released in November 1990 as the second single and title track from her album Rumor Has It.  The song reached number 3 on the Billboard Hot Country Singles & Tracks chart in February 1991.

Music video
The music video was Reba's first of her career to be directed by Jack Cole (who would go on to direct many of her classic early 1990s videos) and premiered in early 1991. It depicts Reba performing the song in a smoky, deserted warehouse.

Chart performance
The song debuted at number 42 on the Hot Country Singles & Tracks for the week of December 1, 1990.

Year-end charts

References

1990 singles
Reba McEntire songs
Song recordings produced by Tony Brown (record producer)
MCA Records singles
Songs written by Bruce Burch
Songs written by Larry Shell
1990 songs